Jettha Tissa II was King of Anuradhapura in the 4th century, whose reign lasted from 332 to 341. He succeeded his brother Sirimeghavanna as King of Anuradhapura and was succeeded by his son Buddhadasa.

See also
 List of Sri Lankan monarchs
 History of Sri Lanka

References

External links
 Kings & Rulers of Sri Lanka
 Codrington's Short History of Ceylon

J
J
J
J